Corteo Peak is an  mountain summit located on the eastern boundary line of North Cascades National Park in Washington state. It is situated west of Rainy Pass in the North Cascades Range. Remnants of the retreating Lewis Glacier hang on its north flank. The nearest higher peak is Black Peak,  to the northwest. Corteo Peak and nearby Mount Benzarino were named by Forest Service surveyor, Lage Wernstedt, after Basque sheepherders he met near these two mountains.

Climate

Corteo Peak is located in the marine west coast climate zone of western North America. Most weather fronts originate in the Pacific Ocean, and travel northeast toward the Cascade Mountains. As fronts approach the North Cascades, they are forced upward by the peaks of the Cascade Range, causing them to drop their moisture in the form of rain or snowfall onto the Cascades (Orographic lift). As a result, the west side of the North Cascades experiences high precipitation, especially during the winter months in the form of snowfall. During winter months, weather is usually cloudy, but, due to high pressure systems over the Pacific Ocean that intensify during summer months, there is often little or no cloud cover during the summer. Because of maritime influence, snow tends to be wet and heavy, resulting in high avalanche danger.

Geology
The North Cascades features some of the most rugged topography in the Cascade Range with craggy peaks, ridges, and deep glacial valleys. The history of the formation of the Cascade Mountains dates back millions of years ago to the late Eocene Epoch. With the North American Plate overriding the Pacific Plate, episodes of volcanic igneous activity persisted.  In addition, small fragments of the oceanic and continental lithosphere called terranes created the North Cascades about 50 million years ago.

During the Pleistocene period dating back over two million years ago, glaciation advancing and retreating repeatedly scoured the landscape leaving deposits of rock debris. The "U"-shaped cross section of the river valleys are a result of recent glaciation. Uplift and faulting in combination with glaciation have been the dominant processes which have created the tall peaks and deep valleys of the North Cascades area.

See also
 
 Geography of the North Cascades
 List of mountain peaks of Washington (state)

References

External links
 National Park Service web site: North Cascades National Park
 Corteo Peak weather: Mountain Forecast

North Cascades
Mountains of Washington (state)
Mountains of Chelan County, Washington
North Cascades National Park
Cascade Range
North Cascades of Washington (state)
North American 2000 m summits